Santeetlah Dam is a hydroelectric development on the Cheoah River (river mile 9) in Graham County, North Carolina. The dam together with a pipeline/tunnel facility, and a powerhouse form the Santeetlah Development. The Santeetlah powerhouse is located on the left bank of the Cheoah Reservoir portion of the Little Tennessee River five miles (8 km) upstream of the Cheoah Dam.

The Santeetlah Project, which began in 1925, was completed in 1928 by the Tallassee Power Company (now Tapoco).

The elevation of Santeetlah Reservoir is  according to the USGS. It has two spillways with a capacity of 50,000 cfs. It is topped by concrete gatehouse which controls water flows into the five mile tunnel running to the Little Tennessee. The project's major elements were listed on the National Register of Historic Places in 2004.

The Santeetlah and Cheoah developments have practically flooded the Cheoah River. Water from Santeetlah is piped to the Rhymer's Ferry generating facility on Cheoah Lake, with any water flowing below the dam coming from downstream tributaries or reservoir overflow.

The facility is owned and operated by Tapoco. The Tennessee Valley Authority (TVA) maintains limited control over lake levels, as the piped output from Lake Santeetlah flows into Topoco's Santeethlah Power House at Rhymer's Ferry upstream from Cheoah Dam and just below Fontana Dam. Overflow travels to the Cheoah River just below the Cheoah Dam.

See also

National Register of Historic Places listings in Graham County, North Carolina

References

External links

 Brookfield Smoky Mountain Hydropower (Brookfield)

Dams on the Little Tennessee River
Dams in North Carolina
Buildings and structures in Graham County, North Carolina
Hydroelectric power plants in North Carolina
Alcoa Power Generating dams
Dams completed in 1928
Energy infrastructure completed in 1928
Industrial buildings and structures on the National Register of Historic Places in North Carolina
Dams on the National Register of Historic Places in North Carolina
Historic districts on the National Register of Historic Places in North Carolina
National Register of Historic Places in Graham County, North Carolina
1928 establishments in North Carolina